This article details the street-naming system of  Arlington County, Virginia in the United States.

Although the streets of Arlington County are not laid out on a grid plan, its local streets follow sequential numbered or alphabetic patterns that are both rational and provide address numbering information.

History of the system
A numbered and alphabetical street-naming scheme suggests that Arlington is or once was laid out on a continuous rectilinear grid plan, which in many parts of the County it is not (although very few parts of the county are laid out using the cul-de-sac type development which is more common in the outer Washington, DC suburbs). Originally, the various communities in the county had independent street-naming conventions. However, when county officials asked the United States Postal Service to place the entire county in a single "Arlington, Virginia" postal area, the USPS refused to do so until the county had a unified addressing system, which the county developed in 1932. For that reason, and also because Arlington contains a number of locations that interrupt the road grid network (including military facilities, parks, golf courses, and limited-access highways), it is common for streets to terminate and continue later on in another location. Arlington now has a policy of adding to the street grid when feasible as part of new development—for example, connections for Quinn Street and Troy Street were recently added to the Master Transportation Plan between Wilson and Clarendon Boulevards.

Specifics of the system
Arlington Boulevard (U.S. Route 50) bisects Arlington County into northern and southern sections, except for a few streets between Fort Myer Military Reservation and Arlington Boulevard, which are designated north even though they are south of Arlington Boulevard.

East–west streets are designated by an ordinal number followed by a designation as either a street, road, place, or avenue, and a north or south designation.  The numbers begin on either side of Arlington Boulevard and increase moving away from it. Therefore, 1st Street North is immediately north of Arlington Boulevard and 1st Street South is immediately south of it.

North–south streets are named and alphabetized (through first letter only) starting at the Potomac River in the east. Progressing westward, the alphabetizing sequence is:

 One-syllable names (Ball Street to Wayne Street)
 Two-syllable names (Adams to Woodrow)
 Three-syllable names (Abingdon to Yucatán)
 Four-syllable names (Arizona is the only street in this sequence)

Arlington's local numbered and named streets are not through streets, except for a few streets in North Arlington, and thus each number or name can appear multiple times at multiple locations in the county but always according to the grid.  For example, there are several 12th Streets South or North Kensington Streets in various areas of the county.  In cases where more names are needed to avoid confusion in areas of denser street construction, numbered (east–west) streets are first designated "street", then "road," then "place," and in one instance, "avenue". For example, 37th Street North, 37th Road North, and 37th Place North are all in the same general area.  Named (north–south) local streets follow rules regarding initial letter and syllable number but there can be multiple street names with the same initial letter number of syllables, almost all ending with "street".  For example, North Kenilworth Street, North Kensington Street, and North Kentucky Street are all in the same area.

Exceptions to the system
Major arteries or historical roads are exempt from the naming and numbering system.  Named streets with the designation "road," "pike," or "highway" instead of "street" usually predate the system and follow early winding routes.  "Boulevards" and "drives" are generally major thoroughfares with historic names. Boulevards usually run east–west and drives, which were constructed on former trolley lines, run north–south but are designated as north and south only when they appear on both sides of Arlington Boulevard.

Notable exceptions include:
Arlington Ridge Road
Army Navy Drive
Campbell Avenue
Columbia Pike
Nelly Custis Drive
Patrick Henry Drive
George Mason Drive
Fort Myer Drive
Glebe Road
Richmond Highway (formerly Jefferson Davis Highway)
Lee Highway
Military Road
Pershing Drive
Quaker Lane
Walter Reed Drive

Address numbers in the system
Address numbers can be determined from the numbers or names of intersecting streets.  Addresses on north–south routes, including exceptions from the numbering and naming system, follow the numbers of intersecting (or implied intersections of) numbered streets.  For example, 2005 South Glebe Road would lie just beyond the intersection of South Glebe Road and 20th Street South.  Addresses on east–west, including exceptions from the numbering and naming system, are based on the intersecting (or implied intersections of) named streets with each letter/syllable combination representing 100 address numbers.  The chart below shows the block numbers on east–west streets. Full-Lot houses often skip 4 numbers in between houses, and town homes generally skip two; while the opposite side of the street is offset by one number, so that one side can be even, and one odd.

Block numbers on east–west streets

 200: Ball
 300: Clark
 400: (Dale)
 500: Eads
 600: Fern
 700: Grant
 800: Hayes
 900: Ives
1000: Joyce
1100: Kent
1200: Lynn
1300: Meade
1400: Nash
1500: Oak
1600: Pierce
1700: Queen
1800: Rolfe
1900: Scott
2000: Taft
2100: Uhle
2200: Veitch
2300: Wayne
2400: Adams
2500: Barton
2600: Cleveland
2700: Danville
2800: Edgewood
2900: Fillmore
3000: Garfield
3100: Highland
3200: Irving
3300: Jackson
3400: Kenmore
3500: Lincoln
3600: Monroe
3700: Nelson
3800: Oakland
3900: Pollard
4000: Quincy
4100: Randolph
4200: Stafford
4300: Taylor
4400: Utah
4500: Vermont
4600: Wakefield
4700: Abingdon
4800: Buchanan
4900: Columbus
5000: Dinwiddie
5100: Edison
5200: Frederick
5300: Greenbrier
5400: Harrison
5500: Illinois
5600: Jefferson
5700: Kensington
5800: Lexington
5900: Madison
6000: Nottingham
6100: Ohio
6200: Powhatan
6300: Quantico
6400: Roosevelt
6500: Sycamore
6600: Tuckahoe
6700: Underwood
6800: Van Buren
6900: Westmoreland
7000: Arizona

Addresses on the south and west (left) sides of the streets are even-numbered.  Below is a complete list of named (north–south) streets within the system.

List of named (north–south) streets within the system
This list includes only those streets which appear as part of the naming system, excluding historical exceptions, and major boulevards or drives.

References

External links
Arlington County's GIS Mapping Center maps of Arlington
Arlington County Streets
Guide to Finding Arlington Streets
Arlington County Virginia Directory of Street names, showing old and new names after 1934 street-name changes campaign

Street Naming System
Arlington County, Virginia